Skullerud is a station on Østensjø Line of the Oslo Metro, located in the Østensjø borough, between Bogerud and Mortensrud. Since its opening 26 November 1967, it was the end station of the line until Østensjøbanen was extended to Mortensrud in 1997. The area around Skullerud station has a mixture of residential areas and businesses, including the former centers for Norsk Data and Tandberg Radio. The station is also a node for several bus lines.

References

External links

Oslo Metro stations in Oslo
Railway stations opened in 1967
1967 establishments in Norway